Sondre Løvseth Rossbach (born 7 February 1996) is a Norwegian football goalkeeper who currently plays for Degerfors IF on loan from Odd.

Playing career
Rossbach played youth football for Brevik and 3. divisjon football for Urædd, but joined Odd after the 2011 season. He made his senior league debut in September 2013 in a 5–1 win against Aalesund as André Hansen was injured.

Before he joined Odd back in 2011, he was offered a 4-year deal with Manchester United, but he had to decline as a result of an operation in his ankle. He is considered one of the most talented goalkeepers in Norway. Following the sale of André Hansen to Rosenborg BK in 2015, Rossbach was appointed to be the new goalkeeper at the age of 19.

In January 2023, Rossbach joined Allsvenskan club Degerfors IF on loan for the 2023 season.

Personal life 
He is a son of former Norway international goalkeeper Einar Rossbach. Rossbach is a member of the Norwegian supporters club of English football club Portsmouth F.C.

Career statistics

Club

References

1996 births
Living people
Sportspeople from Porsgrunn
Norwegian footballers
Association football goalkeepers
Odds BK players
Vålerenga Fotball players
Degerfors IF players
Eliteserien players
Norwegian expatriate footballers
Expatriate footballers in Sweden
Norwegian expatriate sportspeople in Sweden